Sven Gali is the debut album by Canadian hard rock/heavy metal metal band, Sven Gali. It was produced by BMG Canada's David Bendeth and released in 1992. The album includes the singles "Under the Influence", "Love Don't Live Here Anymore", "In My Garden", and "Tie Dyed Skies". It also included a cover of the Teenage Head song "Disgusteen" featuring guest vocals by Frankie Venom. The band made four music videos, all of which were on regular rotation on Much Music.

The album eventually went gold in Canada and was nominated for Hard Rock Album of the Year at the 1993 Juno Awards.

Track listing

References

1992 debut albums
Sven Gali albums